Hisøy Church is a parish church of the Church of Norway in Arendal Municipality in Agder county, Norway. It is located in the village of His on the island of Hisøya. It is one of the churches for the Hisøy parish which is part of the Arendal prosti (deanery) in the Diocese of Agder og Telemark. The white, wooden, empire style church was built in a cruciform design in 1849 using plans drawn up by the architect Gustav Adolph Lammers. The church seats about 500 people. From 1881 until 1992 it was the main church for Hisøy municipality.

History
The earliest existing historical records of the church date back to the year 1320, but the church was likely built during the 13th century. The church was part of the Øyestad Church parish, and this church was likely an annex chapel. In 1620, Hisøy church is not mentioned in the diocese's land register, so the church likely was closed down at that point.

With an increasing population in the 19th century, the difficult road from the island of Hisøy to the mainland Øyestad Church led the island's residents to demand their own church. In 1847, the area of Hisøy was made to be a separate parish from Øyestad, and they immediately set in motion plans to build a church. Gustav Adolph Lammers was hired to design the church. Originally the church was to have two towers, but that didn't work out and it ended up with only one tower. The new church building was consecrated on 11 November 1849.

In 1892, the small original tower on the church was torn down and rebuilt into a larger, more structurally sound tower. In 1896, the balcony seating in the church was rebuilt.

Parish priests
Hisøy Church has had many different parish priests over its history. The first full-time priest assigned to his parish was not until 1872.  The priests are listed below.

1872-1893: Abraham Vilhelm Heffermehl
1894-1900: Vilhelm Bertinus Sørensen
1901-1905: Ludvig Daae Zwilgmeyer
1905-1911: Hans Ellertsen Woll
1911-1915: Erik Olsen Feet
1916-1923: Christoph Heinrich Møller-Nielsen
1923-1931: Eyvind Broch
1931-1951: Olaf Reinhardt Sagedahl
1951-1971: Birger Ulrich Olsen
1973-1978: Volrath Vogt Bugge
1979-1986: Reidar Svoren 
1986-????: Svein Holberg 
Since 2016: Erik Noddeland

See also
List of churches in Agder og Telemark

References

Buildings and structures in Arendal
Churches in Agder
Wooden churches in Norway
Cruciform churches in Norway
19th-century Church of Norway church buildings
Churches completed in 1849
13th-century establishments in Norway
16th-century disestablishments in Norway
1849 establishments in Norway